In 2008, the United States Department of Defense was infected with malware. Described at the time as the "worst breach of U.S. military computers in history", the defense against the attack was named "Operation Buckshot Yankee". It led to the creation of the United States Cyber Command.

History 
It started when a USB flash drive infected by a foreign intelligence agency  at a base in the Middle East. It contained malicious code and was put into a USB port from a laptop computer that was attached to United States Central Command. From there it spread undetected to other systems, both classified and unclassified.

Operation Buckshot Yankee 

The Pentagon spent nearly 14 months cleaning the worm, named agent.btz, from military networks.  Agent.btz, a variant of the SillyFDC worm, has the ability "to scan computers for data, open backdoors, and send through those backdoors to a remote command and control server." It was suspected that Chinese or Russian hackers were behind it because they had used the same code that made up agent.btz before in previous attacks. In order to try to stop the spread of the worm, the Pentagon banned USB drives, and disabled the Windows autorun feature.

References

Further reading
 

United States
Cyberattack On United States, 2008